Limeshain is a municipality in the Wetteraukreis, in Hesse, Germany. It is located approximately 28 kilometers northeast of Frankfurt am Main.

References

Wetteraukreis